Nihaluwal is a village in Shahkot in Jalandhar district of Punjab State, India. The village is administrated by a sarpanch who is an elected representative of village as per Panchayati raj (India).

Population
According to 2011 census report  Nihaluwal has 279 households with the total population of 1433 persons of which 746 are male and 687 are female. The total population of children in the age group 0-6 is 54.

Transport 
Shahkot Malisian station is the nearest train station.

References 

Villages in Jalandhar district